Ratchayothin Station is a BTS Skytrain station, on the Sukhumvit line in Bangkok, Thailand.

It is station on the line, until the opening of the other stations of the Sukhumvit Line Extension (North) planned in 2020. But intensive from Ministry of Transport command open in phase 2 (Ha Yaek Lat Phrao-Kasetsart University) in December 2019.

References

See also 

 Bangkok Skytrain

BTS Skytrain stations
Railway stations opened in 2019